MVC may refer to:

Science and technology
 Maximum-value composite procedure, an imaging procedure
 Multivariable calculus, a concept in mathematics
 Multivariable control, a concept in process engineering
 Mechanical vapor compression, a desalination technology by distillation

Computing
 MIVA Script (file extension .mvc)
 Model–view–controller, an architectural pattern used in software design
ASP.NET MVC, an implementation by Microsoft
 Multiview Video Coding, an extension to 3D film television standards

Organizations
 Macleay Vocational College, a high school in New South Wales, Australia
 Medigen Vaccine Biologics Corporation, a pharmacological company in Taiwan
 Merrimack Valley Conference, a high school athletic conference in Massachusetts, US
 Miami Valley Conference, a high school athletic conference in Ohio, US
 Mississippi Valley Conference (Illinois), a high school athletic conference in Illinois, US
 Mississippi Valley Conference (Iowa), a high school athletic conference in Iowa, US
 Mississippi Valley Conference (Wisconsin), a high school athletic conference in Wisconsin, US
 Missouri Valley Conference, an NCAA Division I collegiate athletic conference in the US
 Motor Vehicle Commission, an alternate name for the Department of Motor Vehicles
 Mountain Valley Conference (New Jersey), a high school athletic conference in New Jersey, US
 Christian Life Movement (Spanish: Movimiento de Vida Cristiana)
 Music and Video Club, a defunct chain of music and video shops in the UK
 Movimiento Victoria Ciudadana (English: Citizens' Victory Movement), a Puerto Rican political party

Education
 Moreno Valley College, in California, US
 Mountain View College (Philippines), Valencia City
 Mountain View College (Texas), Dallas, US
 Melbourn Village College, England

Sport
 Minnesota Vikings Cheerleaders, cheerleaders for the National Football League team Minnesota Vikings
 The Miracle Violence Connection, a former professional wrestling tag team

Transportation
 Monroe County Airport (Alabama) (IATA airport code)
 Motor vehicle collision, indicating a car accident as the cause of injury
 Mountain View Corridor, a planned highway in Utah, US

Other uses
 Male voice choir
 Marvel vs. Capcom, a video game series
 Maha Vir Chakra, a military decoration in India
 Maharishi Vedic City, Iowa
 Mutual violent control, a type of domestic violence